In Greek mythology, Libya (Ancient Greek: Λιβύη) or Libye, was a name shared by two individuals:

 Libya, daughter of the Titan Oceanus and Pompholyge, and the sister of Asia. She may be one of the Oceanids and possibly a daughter of Tethys, the consort of Oceanus. In one account, Libya was the consort of the sea god Triton and by him the mother of various nymphs, probably including the Tritonian nymph who bore Nasamon and Caphaurus to Amphitemis.
 Libya, a princess of Egypt as the daughter of King Epaphus. She became the mother of Belus and Agenor by Poseidon, the god of the sea.

Notes

References 

 Apollonius Rhodius, Argonautica translated by Robert Cooper Seaton (1853-1915), R. C. Loeb Classical Library Volume 001. London, William Heinemann Ltd, 1912. Online version at the Topos Text Project.
Apollonius Rhodius, Argonautica. George W. Mooney. London. Longmans, Green. 1912. Greek text available at the Perseus Digital Library.
Gaius Julius Hyginus, Fabulae from The Myths of Hyginus translated and edited by Mary Grant. University of Kansas Publications in Humanistic Studies. Online version at the Topos Text Project.
 Fowler, Robert L., Early Greek Mythography. Volume 2: Commentary. Oxford University Press. Great Clarendon Street, Oxford, OX2 6DP, United Kingdom. 2013. 

Oceanids
Libyan characters in Greek mythology